Ernest Toussaint (6 March 1908 – 3 September 1942) was a Luxembourgian boxer who competed in the 1936 Summer Olympics. He was born in Rumelange.

Toussaint represented Luxembourg in the 1936 Olympics in Berlin. He defeated Karl Lutz of Austria in the round of 32 before being eliminated in the quarterfinals of the heavyweight class by eventual bronze medalist Erling Nilsen of Norway.

He was shot in the Hinzert concentration camp (Germany) after being arrested as one of the leaders in the general strike against the Nazi occupation in Luxembourg on 31 August 1942. The country had been protesting against the introduction of compulsory military service for young Luxembourgers in the German army. Toussaint's widow and his two sons were deported to the work camp of Leubus in  Silesia.

In 1960 Ernest Toussaint was awarded the Croix de l´Ordre de la Résistance 1940–1944.

References

External links
 profile
 Commémoration à l'occasion du 60e anniversaire de la grève générale du 31 août 1942
 Ernest Toussaint's profile at Sports Reference.com

1908 births
1942 deaths
People from Rumelange
Luxembourgian male boxers
Heavyweight boxers
Olympic boxers of Luxembourg
Boxers at the 1936 Summer Olympics
Resistance members who died in Nazi concentration camps
Luxembourg Resistance members
Luxembourgian people who died in Nazi concentration camps
People executed by Nazi Germany by firearm